Michael Douglas Oulton (born 21 December 1959 in Sackville, New Brunswick) is the current Anglican Bishop of Ontario.

He was educated at the University of New Brunswick. After an earlier career as a lawyer he was ordained Deacon in 1992; and Priest in 1993. He was Rector of Alberton, Prince Edward Island from 1992 to 1997; and of St Peter, Kingston, Ontario from 1997 to 2004; and of  Christ Church, Belleville, Ontario from 2004 to his elevation to the episcopate.

References

1959 births
People from Sackville, New Brunswick
University of New Brunswick alumni
Anglican bishops of Ontario
21st-century Anglican Church of Canada bishops
Living people
University of New Brunswick Faculty of Law alumni